Mary of Great Britain (5 March 1723 – 14 January 1772) was the second-youngest daughter of George II of Great Britain and his wife, Caroline of Ansbach, and Landgravine of Hesse-Kassel as the wife of Frederick II, Landgrave of Hesse-Kassel.

Early life

Princess Mary was born at Leicester House, Westminster, London. Her father was the Prince of Wales, later King George II. Her mother was Caroline of Ansbach, daughter of Johann Friedrich, Margrave of Brandenburg-Ansbach.

Her father succeeded, as George II, on 11 June 1727, and she became "HRH The Princess Mary". Upon her death in 1737, her mother, Queen Caroline, entrusted Mary to her elder sister Caroline, urging her to "do what she could to support the meek and mild disposition of Princess Mary".

Marriage

A marriage was negotiated with Landgrave Frederick of Hesse-Kassel, the only son and heir of William VIII, Landgrave of Hesse-Kassel. For the marriage, Parliament voted Mary £40,000.

They married by proxy at the Chapel Royal of St. James's Palace in London on 8 May, then in person on 28 June 1740 at Kassel.
They had four sons, three of whom survived to adulthood.

The marriage was unhappy, and Frederick was said to be "brutal" and "a boor". Frederick reportedly subjected Mary to spousal abuse.
In late 1746, Mary made an extended trip to Britain to escape his maltreatment. The couple separated in 1754 on Frederick's conversion to Roman Catholicism.  She was supported by her father-in-law, who provided her with a residence in Hanau, as she did not wish to return to Great Britain, but to stay on the continent to raise her children.

In 1756, Mary moved to Denmark, to take care of the children of her sister Louise of Great Britain, who had died in 1751. She took her children with her, and they were raised at the royal court and her sons were married to Danish princesses. Her husband succeeded his father as Landgrave of Hesse-Kassel in 1760, and so Mary was technically Landgravine consort for the last twelve years of her life, despite her estrangement from her husband.

Mary died on 14 or 16 January 1772, aged 48 at Hanau, Germany.

Titles, styles, honours and arms

Titles and styles
 5 March 1723 – 11 June 1727: Her Royal Highness Princess Mary
 11 June 1727 – 8 May 1740: Her Royal Highness The Princess Mary
 8 May 1740 – 25 March 1751: Her Royal Highness Princess Frederick of Hesse-Kassel
 25 March 1751 – 1 February 1760: Her Royal Highness The Hereditary Princess of Hesse-Kassel
 1 February 1760 – 14 January 1772: Her Royal Highness The Landgravine of Hesse-Kassel

Arms
On 30 August 1727, as a child of the sovereign, Mary was granted use of the arms of the realm, differenced by a label argent of three points, each bearing a canton gules.

Issue

Ancestors

References

Sources

 
 
 

|-

1723 births
1772 deaths
18th-century British people
18th-century British women
18th-century German women
British princesses
Hereditary Princesses of Hesse-Kassel
Landgravines of Hesse-Kassel
House of Hanover
House of Hesse-Kassel
People from Westminster
English people of German descent
English people of Scottish descent
Children of George II of Great Britain
Daughters of kings